Amad Butt (born 10 May 1995) is a cricketer from Punjab, Pakistan.

Domestic career
He was the leading wicket-taker for Habib Bank Limited in the 2017–18 Quaid-e-Azam Trophy, with 39 dismissals in eight matches.

In April 2018, he was named in Federal Areas' squad for the 2018 Pakistan Cup. He was the leading wicket-taker for Habib Bank Limited in the 2018–19 Quaid-e-Azam One Day Cup, with fifteen dismissals in nine matches. In March 2019, he was named in Balochistan's squad for the 2019 Pakistan Cup. He was the joint-leading wicket-taker in the tournament, with ten dismissals in five matches.

In September 2019, he was named in Balochistan's squad for the 2019–20 Quaid-e-Azam Trophy tournament. In October 2019, the Pakistan Cricket Board (PCB) named him as one of the six players to watch ahead of the 2019–20 National T20 Cup tournament.

International career
In November 2019, he was named in Pakistan's squad for the 2019 ACC Emerging Teams Asia Cup in Bangladesh. In January 2020, he was named in Pakistan's Twenty20 International (T20I) squad for their series against Bangladesh. In November 2020, he was named in Pakistan's 35-man squad for their tour to New Zealand. In January 2021, he was named in Pakistan's T20I squad for their series against South Africa.

References

External links 
 

1995 births
Living people
Pakistani cricketers
Cricketers from Sialkot
Sialkot cricketers
Islamabad United cricketers
Peshawar Zalmi cricketers
Jamaica Tallawahs cricketers
Habib Bank Limited cricketers
Pakistani people of Kashmiri descent